Everlasting Love (停不了的愛) is a 1984 Hong Kong romance drama film directed by Michael Mak and starring Andy Lau and Irene Wan.

Cast
Andy Lau as Eric
Irene Wan as Pauline Leung Pui Kwun
Loletta Lee as Lulu Leung
Ng Man-tat as Bob

Reception
The film performed well in Hong Kong, grossing HK$10,435,613 during its theatrical run from 22 March to 11 April 1984.

Awards
4th Hong Kong Film Awards
 Nominated: Best Screenplay – Manfred Wong

References

External links
 

1984 films
1984 romantic drama films
Hong Kong romantic drama films
Golden Harvest films
Films directed by Michael Mak
Films set in Hong Kong
Films shot in Hong Kong
1980s Hong Kong films